Venkata Swamy or Venkataswamy is an Indian male given name. Notable people with the name include:

 Dwaram Venkataswamy Naidu (1893–1964), Indian violinist
 G. Venkatswamy (1929–2014), Indian politician
 Mandala Venkata Swamy Naidu, Indian politician

Indian masculine given names